Taroona is a major residential suburb approximately 15 minutes drive from the centre of Hobart, Tasmania on the scenic route between Hobart and Kingston. Although on the edges of the City of Hobart, Taroona is actually part of the municipality of Kingborough. Taroona is bounded on the east by the Derwent River, and has several beaches along the shore, the main beaches with public access are Taroona Beach, Hinsby Beach and Dixons Beach. Past Hinsby Beach, the Alum Cliffs form a section of cliffed coast to the neighbouring suburb of Bonnet Hill.

Name
The name Taroona is derived from the Mouheneener word for chiton, a marine mollusc found on rocks in the intertidal regions of the Taroona foreshore.

History

Traditional owners
Prior to the British colonisation of Tasmania, the land had been occupied for possibly as long as 35,000 years by the semi-nomadic Mouheneener people, a sub-group of the Nuennone, or "South-East tribe". Mouheneener shell middens can be found scattered all along Taroona's foreshores.

European settlement

This district was originally known as Crayfish Point and the diaries of Robert Knopwood contain reference to expeditions to catch crayfish there.

The first European settlement at Taroona took place in the early 19th century, when land was granted to settlers who had relocated from Norfolk Island. For the remainder of that century, the area was largely used for farming, and was sparsely populated.

In the mid 1890s, Clarendon James Cox Lord purchased an 18-acre property which he called Taroona, after an Aboriginal word for sea shell.  Lord built himself a pretty homestead and also established tea rooms where visitors could indulge in delicacies such as strawberries and cream while overlooking the River Derwent, Hobart.

In the first half of the 20th century, more large and elegant residences were built, as well as beach shacks and cottages which were used for seaside holidays by the residents of Hobart. Taroona Post Office opened on 2 August 1906.

On the foreshore above Taroona Beach there is the grave of a young sailor, Joseph Batchelor, who died on the Sailing Ship Venus in the Derwent Estuary in 1810, and was buried ashore on 28 January 1810. It is reputed to be the oldest European grave in Tasmania, and it is a declared Historical site.

After WWII, significant subdivision of Taroona was undertaken, and the suburb's population rapidly expanded. Having been developed mainly in the "era of the automobile", Taroona was from the beginning a commuter suburb, and it has a notable absence of commercial or retail premises, many of the early retail enterprises having lost the battle with larger supermarkets elsewhere.

1967 bushfires 

In February 1967, southern Tasmania was engulfed in the most vicious wildfires on record, resulting in many deaths. Taroona was the closest suburb to the city of Hobart to take the full brunt of the fires, which swept across the suburb in the mid afternoon, wreaking havoc, and destroying many homes. Children and residents fled to the river, and many people's survival was due to the refuge the safe waters provided.

Establishment of Taroona High School 

In 1958 a public High School was established on a large parcel of land on the Channel Highway central to the suburb, and with a frontage on to the foreshore of the Derwent River.

In 1960 the Taroona Primary School re-located to the same site, from an older building further south on the Channel Highway.  Those original primary school buildings were adapted for kindergarten and pre-school but were burnt down by an arsonist in 1974. The kindergarten and pre-school were then re-built adjacent to the primary school.

Taroona High School and Taroona Primary school are completely separate educational institutions, although they do share one oval.

Originally the high school catered for grades 7 to 11, but with the establishment of the separate Matriculation College system in 1962 the grade 11 students were transferred to the Hobart Matriculation College. At its maximum the enrolments at Taroona High School were about 1200 in the 1960s, with students traveling from Ferntree, South Hobart, Sandy Bay, Battery Point, Kingston, Blackmans Bay, and several centers further south.

There are now approximately 1150 students in high school, now only drawing students from the southern suburbs of Hobart. The current principal is Matthew Bennell.

Notable persons 

Taroona was the childhood home of Tasmanian-born Mary, Crown Princess of Denmark, who attended the river-side Taroona High School before completing her high schooling at Mount Nelson's Hobart College and embarking on her tertiary degree at the University of Tasmania.

In the arts, lead vocalist of The Seekers, Judith Durham (born Judith Mavis Cock, 3 July 1943) lived in Taroona as a young girl, and attended the Fahan School in Sandy Bay before moving back to Melbourne in 1956. She joined The Seekers in 1963. Gwen Harwood, poet and librettist, lived in Taroona with her family for a number of years in the nineteen fifties. Louise Lovely, Australia's first actress to achieve fame in Hollywood, spent her later years in Taroona until her death in 1980.

David Bartlett, former Tasmanian premier (2008), was also raised in Taroona.

Shot Tower

Situated on the Channel Highway just south of Taroona is one of the State's most unusual historic buildings, the Shot Tower. The Shot Tower is a 48 m (157 ft) tall, 10 m (32 ft) in diameter circular sandstone tower constructed by Joseph Moir in 1870 from locally quarried sandstone blocks. Lead shot was made by dropping molten lead through a sieve at the top of the tower and by the time it hit the water at the bottom it was cold and spherical in shape. A climb up the 259 steps to the top of the tower gives a wonderful view of the Derwent Estuary.

Truganini Reserve

Just before reaching Taroona is the Truganini Reserve, named after the woman cited (with some contention) as the last surviving "full-blooded" Tasmanian Aboriginal. A steep track leads from the reserve through forest up the side of Mount Nelson to the semaphore station at the summit that offers superb views over the Derwent River. The return walk takes around an hour and a half.

References

External links
Community website http://taroona.tas.au

Localities of Kingborough Council
Shot towers
Taroona, Tasmania